Alessandro Riedle (born 14 August 1991) is a German professional footballer who most recently played as a striker for Swiss club FC Wangen bei Olten. He is the son of former Germany international Karl-Heinz Riedle.

Early years
Riedle started playing football in 1998 with the Liverpool F.C. Academy and switched in summer 1999 to Fulham along with his father Karl-Heinz. In May 2001, after the retirement of his father he left Fulham and England to move to Swiss Grasshopper Club Zürich.

Club career
Riedle started his professional career with Grasshopper Club Zürich, making his first appearance on 11 March 2009 in the Swiss Super League against Neuchâtel Xamax. On 4 June 2009, Riedle signed a two-year contract with VfB Stuttgart. On 25 August 2010, Riedle returned to Grasshoppers. On 5 August 2013, Riedle signed a two-year contract with Süper Lig side Akhisar Belediyespor. Although his time in Turkey did not go well as he was only capped as a substitute for three times.

In September 2014, Riedle joined German fourth-tier club Viktoria Köln. In February 2015, after only earning a single cap in five months, he left Köln again and returned to Switzerland, where he had spent almost a decade of his youth. He joined third-tier club SC Brühl in St. Gallen.

International career
He is former member of the Germany U-18 team.

Personal life
He is the son of former Germany international Karl-Heinz Riedle. He attended St Peter's Primary school in Heswall, Wirral.

References

External links
 
 

1991 births
Living people
People from Lindau (district)
Sportspeople from Swabia (Bavaria)
German footballers
Footballers from Bavaria
Association football forwards
3. Liga players
Swiss Super League players
Süper Lig players
VfB Stuttgart II players
Grasshopper Club Zürich players
AC Bellinzona players
Akhisarspor footballers
FC Viktoria Köln players
SC Brühl players
FC Wangen bei Olten players
German expatriate footballers
German expatriate sportspeople in Switzerland
Expatriate footballers in Switzerland
German expatriate sportspeople in Turkey
Expatriate footballers in Turkey